The Transport Salaried Staffs' Association (TSSA) is a trade union for workers in the transport and travel industries in the United Kingdom and Ireland. Its head office is in London, and it has regional offices in Bristol, Derby, Dublin, Manchester, York and Glasgow.

TSSA has approximately 17,856 members in the UK and Ireland. While principally a union for people in the railway industry, the effect of the nationalisation and subsequent privatisations following the Second World War has meant that it has members working for railway companies, shipping companies, bus companies, travel agencies, airlines, call centres, and IT companies.

Organisation

Individual members are allocated to branches. Historically branches were organised geographically and by grade, e.g. Liverpool; Dublin No. 1; Crewe No. 4 Technical; Crewe Management Staffs (the separate branches for different grades of staff were so that people with grievances against their managers wouldn't find those same managers as members of their branch). In Ireland, branches are still organised on this basis, but in the UK starting in 1998 there was a reorganisation such that members of most branches are employed by a single company e.g. Virgin Midlands - this was required in the fragmented world of the privatised railway because the private companies would not allow access for non-employees onto their premises.

Branches are in turn allocated to divisions - there are 14 geographical divisions, plus one for London Transport. Each division has a Divisional Council which meets at least twice a year, and members in each division elect a member of the Executive Committee (EC). EC members are elected for a three-year term, subject to a maximum of two consecutive terms of office (but can stand again after 3 years off the committee). The Executive Committee meets approximately ten times a year in London and continuously during the four-day annual conference held each May. The EC is responsible for the efficient running of the union, the employment of staff (of whom there are about 70), the oversight of the union's finances, and the implementation of decisions of Annual Conference.

The Annual Conference is the supreme decision-making body of the union. Each branch may send one delegate to the Conference, unless a branch has more than 200 members, in which case it has two delegates. Each branch can submit two motions and two amendments to motions to the Conference Agenda, and once every five years can submit two amendments to the union's Rule Book.

Organisation in Ireland is slightly different. The whole of Ireland forms one Division. As trade union law in the Republic of Ireland forbids trade unions being run by people not resident on the island of Ireland, the EC and Annual Conference cannot directly control the association's activity in the republic as they do in Britain. Instead, the Irish Divisional Council is constituted as the Irish Committee and chaired by the EC member for Ireland, and it operates in a similar manner to the EC. There is a biennial Irish Conference of delegates from all the Irish branches, to set policy solely relating to Ireland. When Irish branches want the Annual Conference to do something, motions to Annual Conference are normally phrased as 'requests' that the Irish Committee consider doing something rather than as the more normal 'instructions' that the Executive Committee do something.

History
The union was founded in Sheffield in 1897 as the National Association of General Railway Clerks, although it was a narrow decision to found the union. The railway companies were strongly opposed to trade unions and two earlier attempts to form a clerks' union had failed and, discouraged, the organisers decided by a majority of only one vote to try a third time - this time successfully. In 1899 it was renamed the Railway Clerks' Association (RCA), and in 1951 it adopted its current name.

The early years were difficult. The third General Secretary, John Stopford-Challener, shot himself in Paris's Bois de Boulogne in 1906; it was only after his suicide that it was discovered that he had absconded with the union's money. After this came the era of A.G. Walkden, who as General Secretary for 30 years led the union to the peak of its influence; the head office in London, built in the early 1960s, was named after him. The railway companies refused to recognise the trade unions until after the strike of 1919, but after that time membership rose steadily, to a peak of some 91,500 in the early 1950s. The subsequent closure of uneconomic railway lines, the Beeching axe, and especially the computerisation of railway offices led to large scale reductions in the eligible membership. Membership was around 75,000 in 1970, 71,000 in 1980, and 39,000 in 1990. There was a rapid loss of around 25% of its membership in the mid to late 1990s because the grades of staff covered by the union were the ones hardest hit when British Rail was broken up from 1994 onwards; however the Executive Committee adopted a policy of seeking to vigorously recruit additional members particularly in those areas such as travel agencies which had not been the principal focus of the union in the past. This has led to more stable membership figures, including a small increase at the turn of the century.

The union has been involved in at least one London Underground strike, between 6 and 7 September 2010.

In July 2015, TSSA endorsed Jeremy Corbyn's campaign in the Labour Party leadership election. TSSA National Political Officer, Sam Tarry spearheaded Corbyn's second leadership campaign.

In 2018, preparatory work for the HS2 railway meant that the TSSA had to vacate its head office since the 1960s, at Walkden House in Melton Street, adjacent to London's Euston Station, and moved to a new head office in Devonshire Square, near Liverpool Street Station.

In September 2021, TSSA announced that is talks in starting merging the union with the North American Boilermakers Union with the viewpoint of completing the merger by 1 July 2022. In January 2022, union representatives voted by 88% to agree to the merger, the union would start to ballot members from 8 February 2022.

In early 2022, the union was granted an injunction on an employee who has accused Manuel Cortes, the general secretary of the TSSA of sexual harassment and of bullying by senior staff members. Cortes claims that he has no memory of the evening due to excessive drinking. The injunction forbids the woman from talking about the alleged harassment and bullying. Later on that year an inquiry was opened into the union, led by Helena Kennedy KC, to examine allegations of sexual harassment and bullying towards women within the union, with Manuel Cortes resigning with immediate effect a month later. The Kennedy inquiry reported in February 2023 that the union had seen a culture of sexual harassment and sexual assault over the course of several years along with coercive behaviour. Kennedy called for several senior leaders of the union to resign and that external auditors should be brought in to examine the union's finances. An earlier critical report which concluded that equality, diversity and inclusion objectives were not being met was not made public until February 2023.

Election results
From 1918 until 1992, the union sponsored a large number of Labour Party candidates, many of whom won election.

Office holders

General Secretaries

1897: Charles Bassett-Vincent
1898: John Hereford
1898: F. Parrish (acting)
1899: John Stopford Challener
1906: William J. West (acting)
1906: Alexander Walkden
1936: William Stott
1940: Charles Gallie
1947: Fred Bostock
1948: Percy Heady (acting)
1949: George Thorneycroft
1953: Bill Webber
1963: John Bothwell
1968: Percy Coldrick
1973: David Mackenzie
1977: Tom Bradley (acting)
1977: Tom Jenkins
1982: Bert Lyons
1989: Richard Rosser
2004: Gerry Doherty
2011: Manuel Cortes
2022: Frank Ward (acting)

Presidents
1897: J. Batty Langley
1899: W. D. Leaver
1900: Fortescue Flannery
1906: William J. West
1908: George Lathan
1912: Herbert Romeril
1916: W. E. Williams
1919: Harry Gill
1932: Fred Simpson
1937: Frederick Watkins
1943: Percy Morris
1953: James Haworth
1956: Ray Gunter
1964: Tom Bradley
1977: Walter Johnson
1981: Jim Mills
1987: Geoff Henman
1993: Brenda Hanks	
1997: David Horton
2001: David Porter
2005: Andy Bain
2011: Harriet Yeo
2013: Mick Carney

Treasurers
Until 1906 the General Secretary also controlled the unions' funds. John Stopford-Challener's embezzlement proved that this was an unwise arrangement and the office of National Treasurer was then instituted.
1906: J. M. Roberts
1920: W. E. Williams
1927: Arnold Ernest Townend
1934: Frederick Watkins MP
1937: Percy Morris
1943: James Haworth MP
1953: Ray J. Gunter MP
1956: Lord Lindgren
1961: Tom G. Bradley MP
1965: Walter Johnson MP
1977: Jock Newall (acting)
1977: Jim Mills
1981: Stanley Cohen MP
1984: Geoff Henman
1987: Brenda Hanks
1993: Peter Holloway (acting)
1993: David Horton
1997: David Porter
2001: Annie Breen
2004: Amarjit Singh (acting)
2004: Andy Bain
2005: Harriet Yeo
2011: Mick Carney
2013: Andy Bain
2015: Jason Turvey

References

External links

 TSSA British website
 TSSA Irish website 
 Single or Return - the official history of the TSSA 
Catalogue of the TSSA archives, held at the Modern Records Centre, University of Warwick

 
1897 establishments in the United Kingdom
Railway unions in the United Kingdom
Organisations based in the London Borough of Camden
Trade unions established in 1897
Transport trade unions in Ireland
Trade unions affiliated with the Labour Party (UK)
Trade unions based in London
Trade unions affiliated with the Trades Union Congress